Marco Mangold (born 7 April 1987) is a Swiss football midfielder who currently plays for Zug 94.

Career
In July 2014, he joined FC Thun from FC Schaffhausen.

References

External links
 

1987 births
Living people
Swiss men's footballers
FC Schaffhausen players
SC Kriens players
FC Thun players
FC Winterthur players
Swiss Super League players
Swiss Challenge League players
Association football midfielders